The final league standings of the two Isle of Man Football League tables; as well as the results in of the domestic cup competitions for the 2004–05 season.

League tables

Division 1

Division 2

Cups

FA Cup

Laxey   0–3    St Georges

Railway Cup
Marown   0–6    St Georges

Charity Shield
St Georges   0–0    Laxey
4–5 on penalties

Hospital Cup
St Georges   2–3    Douglas Royal

Woods Cup
Corinthians   4–1    Police

Paul Henry Gold Cup
Union Mills   0–4    St Johns United

Junior Cup
Laxey   3–1    St Marys

Cowell Cup (U19)
Douglas HSOB   3–0    Peel

References 

Isle of Man Football League seasons
Man
Foot
Foot